Thilak Fernando (born 28 March 1967) is a Sri Lankan former cricketer. He played 37 first-class matches between 1988 and 2004. He is now an umpire and stood in matches in the 2016–17 Districts One Day Tournament.

References

External links
 

1967 births
Living people
Sri Lankan cricketers
Sri Lankan cricket umpires
Saracens Sports Club cricketers
Sri Lanka Air Force Sports Club cricketers